Scott Petri (born 1960) is an American politician who was a member of the Pennsylvania House of Representatives from the 178th Legislative District.  He was the Chairman of House Urban Affairs and the House Ethics Committee. He also served as a member of the Liquor Control Committees. Petri served as executive director of the Philadelphia Parking Authority.

Career
Prior to being elected to the House, Petri was a practicing attorney, he served as counsel to Upper Makefield Township and New Britain. He also served on the Upper Makefield Township planning commission and as solicitor to the township.

In 2002, Petri defeated Philadelphia sportscaster Carl Cherkin to succeed retiring Rep. Roy Reinard. He has been re-elected to each succeeding session of the House.

Petri filed his Statement of Candidacy with the Federal Election Commission in October 2015 for the PA-8 2016 Congressional Race.

Personal
A graduate of Villanova University School of Law (1985), Petri also earned a Bachelor of Arts degree cum laude from Washington and Jefferson College (1982) in Washington, Pennsylvania, and is a graduate of Downingtown Senior High School.

He resides in New Hope, Pennsylvania with his wife and son.

At 6'8", Petri was the tallest member of the General Assembly.

Awards 
2015 - "State Public Official of the Year" by Pennsylvania Bio (statewide trade association representing the life science industry).

2014 - National Federation of Independent Business - "Guardian of Small Business" award.

2012 - "State Public Official of the Year" by Pennsylvania Bio (statewide trade association representing the life science industry).

References

External links
Representative Scott Petri's official web site

Republican Party members of the Pennsylvania House of Representatives
People from New Hope, Pennsylvania
Villanova University School of Law alumni
Washington & Jefferson College alumni
21st-century American politicians
1960 births
Living people